Rodion Bochkov (born 27 September 1993) is a Russian weightlifter competing in the 105 kg category until 2018 and 109 kg starting in 2018 after the International Weightlifting Federation reorganized the categories.

Career
In 2019 he competed at the 2019 European Weightlifting Championships in the 109 kg division, winning a silver medal in the snatch and a bronze medal in the total.

Major results

References

Living people
1993 births
Russian male weightlifters
European Weightlifting Championships medalists
20th-century Russian people
21st-century Russian people